MotoGP '07 is the fifth game of the MotoGP game series for the PlayStation 2 and the first published by Capcom.

Features
The game features all the official riders, tracks, teams and bikes of the 2007 MotoGP season, including the Ilmor Ilmor SRT. The game allows the player to race in 5 game modes: Quick Race, Time Attack, Championship, Challenges and Multiplayer in a variety of difficulties and weather conditions.

According to the publisher the game offers challenging weather effects, accurate physics models based on real data and sound effects recorded from real MotoGP bikes.

Xbox 360 and PC version

In 2007 Capcom purchased the "PlayStation format rights" for MotoGP previously owned by Namco through 2012. The Xbox 360 and PC format rights belong to THQ. Though the PS2 and the Xbox 360/PC games have the same title and are based on the 2007 MotoGP season the games are not related.

In 2013, Milestone returned to making the MotoGP game in their own right, a pattern which continues to this day.

Reception

The game received "mixed" reviews according to the review aggregation website Metacritic. In Japan, Famitsu gave it a score of three sevens and one eight for a total of 29 out of 40.

See also
SBK-07: Superbike World Championship, the contemporary installment of the Superbike World Championship series developed by Milestone for Sony platforms

References

External links

2007 video games
Capcom games
Grand Prix motorcycle racing video games
Grand Prix motorcycle racing
Milestone srl games
Multiplayer and single-player video games
PlayStation 2 games
PlayStation 2-only games
Racing video games
THQ games
Video games developed in Italy
Video games set in Australia
Video games set in China
Video games set in England
Video games set in France
Video games set in Germany
Video games set in Italy
Video games set in Japan
Video games set in Malaysia
Video games set in Portugal
Video games set in Qatar
Video games set in Spain
Video games set in the Czech Republic
Video games set in the Netherlands
Video games set in Turkey